Cephalocassis borneensis is a species of catfish in the family Ariidae. It was described by Pieter Bleeker in 1851, originally under the genus Pimelodus. It is found in brackish and freshwater bodies such as the Mekong river, with its habitat ranging between Thailand and Indonesia. It feeds on a variety of finfish, mollusks, benthic crustaceans, and plant detritus.

Cephalocassis borneensis meat is sold fresh.

References

Ariidae
Fish described in 1851